Christine Morris may refer to:

 Christine Morris series, a book series by Maureen Jennings
 Christine Wigfall Morris (1922–2014), American librarian
 Christine E. Morris, Irish archaeologist

See also
 Christine Ballengee-Morris (born 1955), professor at Ohio State University